Qualtrics is an American experience management company, with co-headquarters in Seattle, Washington, and Provo, Utah, in the United States. The company was founded in 2002 by Scott M. Smith, Ryan Smith, Jared Smith, and Stuart Orgill.

Qualtrics offers a cloud-based subscription software platform for experience management, which it launched in March 2017.

On November 11, 2018, it was announced that Qualtrics would be acquired by SAP for US$8 billion. The acquisition was completed on January 23, 2019. On July 26, 2020, SAP announced its intent to take Qualtrics to the public, and on January 28, 2021, Qualtrics began trading on the Nasdaq. In March 2023, an investor group led by private equity firm Silver Lake agreed to take Qualtrics private.

History

Funding and valuation
In 2012, the company received a $70 million Series A investment from Sequoia Capital and Accel, It was the largest joint investment to date by these two firms. In September 2014, the two firms returned in Series B funding, led by Insight Partners worth $150 million, a record for a Utah-based company, and valuing the company at $1 billion.

Filing for IPO 
On October 19, 2018, Qualtrics filed their S-1 registration statement with the intention of raising gross proceeds of $200 million through an initial public offering (IPO) of its Class B shares. At the time, the company listed 9,000 global customers. The company was meant to be listed on the NASDAQ exchange under the ticker "XM" in reference to their flagship experience management product, the Qualtrics XM Platform.

Plans for the IPO were scrapped when it was announced in November 2018 that Qualtrics would be acquired by SAP (NYSE: SAP).

Awards and ranking
In 2020, Qualtrics earned a ‘Leader’ designation in Gartner's Magic Quadrant for Voice of Customer, a ‘leader’ designation in Forrester's Employee Experience for Enterprise wave, and the top ranking in G2's Experience Management category. In 2016, Qualtrics was ranked #12 on the Forbes Cloud 100 list, moving to #6 in 2017. In March 2020, Qualtrics' CoreXM platform was named a 2020 gold winner by the Edison Awards in the Applied Technology category.

Acquisitions
In May 2016, Qualtrics acquired statistical analysis startup Statwing for an undisclosed sum. Statwing was a San Francisco-based company that created point-and-click software for advanced statistical analysis.

In April 2018 the firm acquired Delighted for an undisclosed sum. Delighted had more than 1,500 customers at the time of acquisition.

Acquisition by SAP SE 
In November 2018, SAP announced its intent to acquire Qualtrics. SAP acquired all outstanding shares of Qualtrics for US$8 billion in an all cash deal. SAP secured €7 billion in financing. At the time it was announced, the Qualtrics acquisition was SAP's second-biggest purchase ever, behind the $8.3 billion acquisition of travel and expense management firm Concur in 2014. The acquisition was formally closed January 23, 2019.

Initial public offering (IPO) 
On 26 July 2020, SAP announced its intent to take Qualtrics public through an IPO in the United States. According to SAP, the decision to go public was made due to Qualtrics' performance since the acquisition, with 2019 cloud growth in excess of 40 percent. SAP's stated intent is to remain the majority shareholder. While acknowledging that the spinoff made financial sense due to market conditions, Patrick Moorhead, founder and principal analyst at Moor Insight & Strategy, felt there was also a corporate culture clash. In his view, SAP couldn't find a way to co-exist with the younger, more nimble Qualtrics. On January 28, 2021, Qualtrics began trading on the Nasdaq at $41.85 per share. After reaching an intraday high a week later above $57, the stock settled into a trading range from approximately $30 to $40 for the remainder of the first half of 2021. As of June, 2022, the stock had fallen as low as $12.71 and generally hovered around $13.25.

On January 11, 2021, technical trade media noted that Brad Anderson, a high level executive of Microsoft, was leaving for Qualtrics.

In May 2022, Qualtrics announced that they will go live on Amazon Web Services (AWS) cloud infrastructure in London in the second half of 2022. Qualtrics customers will be able to access Qualtrics XM/OS platform locally via AWS London region. Furthermore, Qualtrics announced that they will be opening a London office and customer experience centre.

Divestment by SAP SE 
In March 2023, a group of investors including private equity firm Silver Lake, CPP Investment Board, and co-founder Ryan Smith agreed to buy Qualtrics from SAP in an all-cash deal worth $12.5billion.

Experience management
Qualtrics launched its experience management platform in March 2017. Experience management is the practice of designing and improving products, services, and experiences for businesses and other organizations.

Research
Quantitative statistical analysis performed with Qualtrics has been cited in a number of professional and academic journals. Qualtrics became the first employee management platform measuring employee experiences through key metrics powered by predictive intelligence. Researchers have used it as a survey tool and combine it with SPSS to analyze their survey data on employee experiences and many other types of survey data.

See also
 Qualtrics Tower

References

External links
 

American companies established in 2002
Software companies based in Utah
Companies based in Provo, Utah
Companies listed on the Nasdaq
Polling companies
Software companies established in 2002
Statistical survey software
Web applications
Cloud computing providers
Cloud applications
Service-oriented (business computing)
Market research companies of the United States
Market research
2002 establishments in Utah
Software companies based in Seattle
2019 mergers and acquisitions
SAP SE acquisitions
American subsidiaries of foreign companies
Software companies of the United States
2021 initial public offerings
Announced mergers and acquisitions